Richard Southwell was an Irish politician.

Birth and origins 
Richard was the only son of Thomas Southwell and his wife Elizabeth Starkey. His father was the 1st Baronet Southwell of Castle Mattress, County Limerick. His mother was the daughter of William Starkey.

Political career and death 
In 1661, Southwell was elected to the Irish House of Commons for Askeaton in County Limerick, representing the borough until 1666.

Marriage and children 
Southwell married Elizabeth O'Brien, daughter of Murrough O'Brien, 1st Earl of Inchiquin. They had five sons and two daughters.

Death and succession 
Southwell died in September 1688. Having predeceased his father, Southwell's oldest son Thomas succeeded his grandfather as baronet and was later elevated to the Peerage of Ireland as Baron Southwell. His third son William and his fifth son Richard sat both in the Parliament of Ireland.

Notes and References

Notes

Citations 

1688 deaths
Politicians from County Limerick
Heirs apparent who never acceded
Members of the Parliament of Ireland (pre-1801) for County Limerick constituencies
Year of birth unknown
Irish MPs 1661–1666